Okot Moses Junior Bitek is a Ugandan lawyer and politician who serves as a member of Parliament representing Kioga Constituency Amolatar District.   He was elected on 14th January 2021. He is a member  of the FDC party.

Early Life and background 
Okot was born in Gulu District to Mr. Angiro John (father) a retired teacher and Miss Imat Keller Angiro (mother) of the Okarowok Clan. Okot attended Amuca SDA Primary School for his PLE, Aputi Secondary School for O-level (2001-2005) and Gombe Secondary School for his A-level (2006-2007).   In 2015, Okot graduated with a Bachelor of Laws from Makerere University as well as he received his Diploma in Legal Practice from Law Development Centre in 2017.

Career

Working experience
While he was at Law Development Centre, Okot served as Guild President from 2016 to 2017. 
For a period of 3years (2017-2020), Okot Jr was an associate lawyer with Oloya & Company Advocates, a law firm based in Gulu town. He served as a chairperson of the Forum for Democratic Change at Makerere University (2010-2011). Currently, Okot practices with Gem and Company Advocates.

Political career
In January 2021, he was elected as a Member of Parliament representing Kioga Constituency in Amolatar District in the eleventh Parliament of Uganda (2021 to 2026) in the 2021 Ugandan general election and on 21st May 2021 he sworn in as the Member of Parliament. He won with 8537 votes defeating NRM’s candidate Okello Anthony He is a member on the Human Rights Committee and of the Defense and Internal Affairs since 2021.  He serves as the Deputy Chairperson of Lango Parliamentary Caucus since 2021.  In May 2022, Okot contested as FDC party's flag bearer in the race for the deputy speaker of the 11th parliament.

Conflicts
He was shot on the leg by a Uganda People’s Defence Forces (UPDF) soldier while holding a mobilisation rally for People Power, in Amolatar District.

Personal life
Okot belongs to FDC party.

References

External references
Twitter Account for Moses Okot\
Big Story: CMI arrests FDC MP Moses Okot Bitek
MPS RESULTS 2021

Ugandan politicians
21st-century Ugandan lawyers
Year of birth missing (living people)
Living people